Zoangpighin is a village in the Boudry Department of Ganzourgou Province in central Burkina Faso. The village has a population of 919.

References

Populated places in the Plateau-Central Region
Ganzourgou Province